Caroline Champetier (born 16 July 1954) is a French cinematographer. She has contributed to more than one hundred films since 1979. She won the César Award for Best Cinematography for her work on Of Gods and Men in 2011. 

She was the president of the French Society of Cinematographers (AFC) between 2009 and 2012. In 2023, she was awarded Berlinale Camera award for lifetime achievement at 73rd Berlin International Film Festival.

She has a daughter with Louis-Do de Lencquesaing, Alice de Lencquesaing, who is an actress.

Selected filmography

As cinematographer

As director/screenwriter

References

External links
 

1954 births
Living people
Cinematographers from Paris
French women cinematographers
French women film directors
French women screenwriters
French screenwriters